Piedmont Athens Regional (formerly known as Athens Regional Medical Center or ARMC) is a healthcare system located in Athens, Georgia, that consists of an acute care hospital with 350-plus beds, four urgent care centers, a network of physicians and specialists, and a home health agency. The healthcare system serves a 17-county area and is one of the largest healthcare systems in northeast Georgia.

Athens Regional Medical Center was named Piedmont Athens Regional when it joined Piedmont Healthcare in late 2016.

External links 
Piedmont Athens Regional
Piedmont Healthcare
AU-UGA Medical Partnership

Hospital buildings completed in 1919
Hospitals in Georgia (U.S. state)
Buildings and structures in Athens, Georgia